Christian Perez (born 13 May 1963) is a French former footballer who played as a forward first and later as an attacking midfielder.

Club career
Born in Marseille, Bouches-du-Rhône, Perez amassed Ligue 1 totals of 268 games and 44 goals over the course of 11 seasons, representing  Nîmes Olympique (making his debut in the competition at the age of 16, he went on to appear for the club in all three major levels of French football), Montpellier HSC, Paris Saint-Germain FC, AS Monaco FC and Lille OSC.

Perez retired in 1997 at 34, after two years in the Chinese Super League with Shanghai Shenhua FC.

International career
Perez earned the first of his 22 caps for the France national team on 19 November 1988, starting and scoring in a 2–3 away defeat against Yugoslavia for the 1990 FIFA World Cup qualifiers. Selected for the UEFA Euro 1992 finals by coach Michel Platini, he played three incomplete games in an eventual group exit in Sweden.

Honours
Nîmes
Coupe de France runner-up: 1995–96

References

External links
 
 
 

1963 births
Living people
French people of Spanish descent
Footballers from Marseille
French footballers
Association football midfielders
Association football forwards
Ligue 1 players
Ligue 2 players
Championnat National players
Nîmes Olympique players
Montpellier HSC players
Paris Saint-Germain F.C. players
AS Monaco FC players
Lille OSC players
Chinese Super League players
Shanghai Shenhua F.C. players
France international footballers
UEFA Euro 1992 players
French expatriate footballers
Expatriate footballers in China
French expatriate sportspeople in China